Marsel Dzhekshenovich Islamkulov (born 18 April 1994) is a Kazakhstani-Kyrgyzstani footballer who plays as a goalkeeper for Abdysh-Ata Kant.

Career

As a youth player, Islamkulov joined the youth academy of Dynamo (Kyiv), Ukraine's most successful club, after playing for the youth academy of Abdysh-Ata in Kyrgyzstan.

Before the 2013 season, he signed for Kazakhstani second division side Astana-1964.

References

External links

 
 

Kyrgyzstani expatriate footballers
Kyrgyzstani people of Kazakhstani descent
1994 births
FC Abdysh-Ata Kant players
FC Kaisar players
Kazakhstan First Division players
Kyrgyzstani footballers
Kazakhstani expatriate footballers
Kazakhstani expatriate sportspeople in Ukraine
Kazakhstani footballers
Living people
Expatriate footballers in Ukraine
Expatriate footballers in Kazakhstan
Kazakhstan Premier League players
Association football goalkeepers
People from Chüy Region